Employment Policy Convention, 1964 is an International Labour Organization convention.

It was established in 1964, with the preamble stating:
Considering that the Declaration of Philadelphia recognises the solemn obligation of the International Labour Organisation to further among the nations of the world programmes which will achieve full employment and the raising of standards of living, and that the Preamble to the Constitution of the International Labour Organisation provides for the prevention of unemployment and the provision of an adequate living wage,...

Ratifications
As of November 2021, the convention has been ratified by 115 states.

External links 
Text.
Ratifications

International Labour Organization conventions
Treaties concluded in 1964
Treaties entered into force in 1966
Treaties of Albania
Treaties of Algeria
Treaties of Antigua and Barbuda
Treaties of Armenia
Treaties of Australia
Treaties of Austria
Treaties of Azerbaijan
Treaties of Barbados
Treaties of the Byelorussian Soviet Socialist Republic
Treaties of Belgium
Treaties of Bolivia
Treaties of Bosnia and Herzegovina
Treaties of the military dictatorship in Brazil
Treaties of Bulgaria
Treaties of Burkina Faso
Treaties of Burundi
Treaties of the Khmer Republic
Treaties of Cameroon
Treaties of Canada
Treaties of the Central African Republic
Treaties of Chad
Treaties of Chile
Treaties of the People's Republic of China
Treaties of the Comoros
Treaties of Costa Rica
Treaties of Croatia
Treaties of Cuba
Treaties of Cyprus
Treaties of the Czech Republic
Treaties of Czechoslovakia
Treaties of Denmark
Treaties of Djibouti
Treaties of the Dominican Republic
Treaties of Ecuador
Treaties of El Salvador
Treaties of Estonia
Treaties of Fiji
Treaties of Finland
Treaties of France
Treaties of Gabon
Treaties of Georgia (country)
Treaties of West Germany
Treaties of Greece
Treaties of Guatemala
Treaties of Guinea
Treaties of Honduras
Treaties of the Hungarian People's Republic
Treaties of Iceland
Treaties of India
Treaties of Pahlavi Iran
Treaties of Ba'athist Iraq
Treaties of Ireland
Treaties of Israel
Treaties of Italy
Treaties of Jamaica
Treaties of Japan
Treaties of Jordan
Treaties of Kazakhstan
Treaties of South Korea
Treaties of Kyrgyzstan
Treaties of Latvia
Treaties of Lebanon
Treaties of the Libyan Arab Republic
Treaties of Lithuania
Treaties of Luxembourg
Treaties of North Macedonia
Treaties of Madagascar
Treaties of Mali
Treaties of Mauritania
Treaties of Moldova
Treaties of the Mongolian People's Republic
Treaties of Montenegro
Treaties of Morocco
Treaties of Mozambique
Treaties of the Netherlands
Treaties of New Zealand
Treaties of Namibia
Treaties of Nicaragua
Treaties of Niger
Treaties of Norway
Treaties of Panama
Treaties of Papua New Guinea
Treaties of Paraguay
Treaties of Peru
Treaties of the Philippines
Treaties of the Polish People's Republic
Treaties of Portugal
Treaties of the Socialist Republic of Romania
Treaties of Rwanda
Treaties of Saint Vincent and the Grenadines
Treaties of Senegal
Treaties of Serbia and Montenegro
Treaties of Slovakia
Treaties of Slovenia
Treaties of the Soviet Union
Treaties of Francoist Spain
Treaties of Sri Lanka
Treaties of the Democratic Republic of the Sudan
Treaties of Suriname
Treaties of Sweden
Treaties of Switzerland
Treaties of Tajikistan
Treaties of Thailand
Treaties of Togo
Treaties of Trinidad and Tobago
Treaties of Tunisia
Treaties of Turkey
Treaties of Turkmenistan
Treaties of Uganda
Treaties of the Ukrainian Soviet Socialist Republic
Treaties of the United Kingdom
Treaties of Uruguay
Treaties of Uzbekistan
Treaties of Venezuela
Treaties of Vietnam
Treaties of the Yemen Arab Republic
Treaties of Yugoslavia
Treaties of Zambia
Treaties extended to the Netherlands Antilles
Treaties extended to Aruba
Treaties extended to the Faroe Islands
Treaties extended to Greenland
Treaties extended to the Territory of Papua and New Guinea
Treaties extended to Norfolk Island
Treaties extended to French Comoros
Treaties extended to French Somaliland
Treaties extended to French Polynesia
Treaties extended to New Caledonia
Treaties extended to Saint Pierre and Miquelon
Treaties extended to Guernsey
Treaties extended to the Isle of Man
1964 in labor relations